John Paterson (1776–1855) was a Scottish missionary in Scandinavia and the Russian Empire. He earned his doctorate from the University of Abo and was instrumental in the operation of the Russian Bible Society for several years eventually being pensioned by Czar Nicholas I. He returned  to Edinburgh, where he served as secretary for Scotland of the London Missionary Society.

Life
Paterson, third child of George Paterson of Duntocher in the parish of Old Kilpatrick, near Glasgow, was born at Duntocher on 26 February 1776, and became a student at the University of Glasgow in 1798. He was attracted by the religious revival which sprang out of the preaching of James Alexander Haldane, and applied for admission into a class formed by the Congregationalists to train young men for the ministry. He was sent to Dundee, and spent the greater part of 1800 there, under the care of 
W. Innes. Removing to Glasgow, he on 5 July 1803 became the minister of a church which he had formed at Cambuslang, but he relinquished it on 17 June 1804, with the intention of going out as a missionary to India.

Accordingly, on 27 August, accompanied by his friend, Ebenezer Henderson, he sailed for Denmark, with the intention of going thence to India; but finding it impossible to carry out this intention, he remained in Northern Europe, and became a zealous and useful missionary there. Gradually his connection with the churches in Edinburgh was dissolved, and he was left to his own resources. He remained in Denmark until after the bombardment of Copenhagen in 1807, when he removed and settled in Stockholm. Here during the next five years he continued his labours among the natives of Scandinavia. The British and Foreign Bible Society afforded him aid in carrying out his plans (though he was at no time the society's salaried agent).

After having helped to Finnish Lutheran Archbishop Jacob Tengstrom to establish the Finnish Bible Society in 1812, he removed to St. Petersburg, and on 1 November 1817 he received the degree of doctor of theology from the University of Åbo in Finland. In 1822 he withdrew from the British and Foreign Bible Society, and Prince Galitzin and other friends in St. Petersburg requested him to conduct the affairs of the Russian Bible Society. Emperor Alexander I of Russia granted him an annual salary of six thousand roubles. On the death of the emperor the party in power raised objections to the circulation of the scriptures. Ultimately, in 1825, the Emperor Nicholas issued ukases suspending the operations of the Bible Society, and placing the society under the control of the Greek church. Thereupon Paterson left Russia; but the emperor treated him with great kindness, and continued to him his pension for life. During his residence in Northern Europe he was connected with the work of translating and printing portions of the scriptures into Finnish, Georgian, Icelandic, Lapponese, Lettish, Moldavian, Russ, Samogitian, and Swedish.

On returning home he settled in Edinburgh, and served for many years as secretary for Scotland of the London Missionary Society, also acting as chairman of the committee of the Congregational Union. In Edinburgh he lived at 11 Salisbury Place in the South Side.

In 1850 he removed to Dundee, where he occasionally preached.

Family

He married, first, at Stockholm, on 31 August 1809, Katrine Margarete Hollinder, who died 7 March 1813, leaving two children, one of whom, Dr. George, born 18 March 1811, became congregational minister at Tiverton. Paterson married, secondly, on 19 April 1817, Jane, daughter of Admiral Samuel Greig, of the Russian navy; she was born in Russia on 26 October 1783, and, from her knowledge of Russian dialects, was of much help to her husband in his work at St. Petersburg. She died on 19 January 1820, leaving a daughter, who became the wife of Edward Baxter of Kincaldrum.

He died during a visit to his daughter at Kincaldrum, Forfarshire, on 6 July 1855. He is buried in the Western Cemetery, Dundee. The grave lies against the first upper terrace, towards its east end.

Publications
Paterson was the author of:
 ‘A Letter to H. H. Norris, containing Animadversions on his Respectful Letter to the Earl of Liverpool on the Subject of the Bible Society,’ 1823.
 ‘The Book for every Land: Reminiscences of Labour and Adventure in the Work of Bible Circulation in the North of Europe and in Russia.’ Edited, with a ‘Prefatory Memoir,’ by W. L. Alexander, 1858. The ‘Memoir’ is on pp. xi–xxxv.
 "Extracts of Letters from the Rev. John Paterson and the Rev. Ebenezer Henderson during their Respective Tours through the East Sea Provinces of Russia, Sweden, Denmark, Jutland, Holstein, Swedish Pomerania, &c. to Promote the Object of the British and Foreign Bible Society". London 1817 (available online)

References

Attribution
; Endnotes:
 Norrie's Dundee Celebrities, 1873, pp. 162–4
 Swan's Memoir of Mrs. Paterson, 1824.

External links

1776 births
1855 deaths
People from West Dunbartonshire
Alumni of the University of Glasgow
Scottish Congregationalist missionaries
Congregationalist missionaries in Russia
Congregationalist missionaries in Europe
Protestant missionaries in Denmark
Protestant missionaries in Sweden